Žďárec is a municipality and village in Brno-Country District in the South Moravian Region of the Czech Republic. It has about 400 inhabitants.

Administrative parts
Villages of Ostrov and Víckov are administrative parts of Žďárec.

Notable people
Anna Pammrová (1860–1945), writer, feminist and philosopher; died here

References

Villages in Brno-Country District